Mud Lake is a lake located by Redwood, New York. The water from adjacent Crystal Lake flows into Mud Lake and the outlet flows into Butterfield Lake. Fish species present in the lake are northern pike, yellow perch, brown bullhead, and bluegill. There is only carry-down boat access on this lake.

References 

Lakes of New York (state)
Lakes of Jefferson County, New York